Tropidia is a genus hoverflies, from the family Syrphidae, in the order Diptera.

Species
Tropidia albistylum Macquart, 1847
Tropidia calcarata Williston, 1887
Tropidia coloradensis (Bigot, 1884)
Tropidia fasciata Meigen, 1822
Tropidia flavimana Philippi, 1865
Tropidia flavipicta (Bigot, 1859)
Tropidia incana Townsend, 1895
Tropidia incerta Keiser, 1971
Tropidia insularis Lynch Arribálzaga, 1892
Tropidia longa (Walker, 1849)
Tropidia mamillata Loew, 1861
Tropidia namorana Keiser, 1971
Tropidia montana Hunter, 1896
Tropidia nigricornis Philippi, 1865
Tropidia notata (Bigot, 1882)
Tropidia pulchra Hull, 1944
Tropidia pygmaea Shannon, 1926
Tropidia quadrata (Say, 1824)
Tropidia rostrata Shiraki, 1930
Tropidia rubricornis Philippi, 1865
Tropidia scita (Harris, 1780)
Tropidia tumulata (Lewis, 1973)

References

Diptera of Europe
Diptera of North America
Diptera of South America
Diptera of Asia
Diptera of Africa
Hoverfly genera
Taxa named by Johann Wilhelm Meigen
Eristalinae